Clitocybe menthiodora is a species of agaric fungus in the family Tricholomataceae. Found in northern Europe, it was described as new to science in 1969 by Finnish mycologist Harri Harmaja. Dry fruitbodies have an odour similar to menthol, a feature for which the fungus is named.

References

External links

menthiodora
Fungi described in 1969
Fungi of Europe